Philip Hendrik Jan Jongeneel (1 July 1893 – 5 April 1985) was a Dutch rower. He competed in the men's eight event at the 1920 Summer Olympics.

References

External links
 

1893 births
1985 deaths
Dutch male rowers
Olympic rowers of the Netherlands
Rowers at the 1920 Summer Olympics
Sportspeople from Rotterdam